Marine Fighter Training Squadron 401 (VMFT-401) is an adversary squadron of the United States Marine Corps Reserve, flying the F-5N Tiger II. Known as the "Snipers", the squadron is the only adversary squadron in the Marine Corps, also is the first and only reserve squadron in the Marine Corps tasked to act as the opposing force in simulated air combat. They are based at Marine Corps Air Station Yuma and fall under the command of the 4th Marine Aircraft Wing and Marine Aircraft Group 41. VMFT-401 is a non-deployable unit.

Mission
Provide instruction to active and reserve Fleet Marine Forces and Fleet squadrons through dissimilar air combat training (DACT).

The majority of VMFT-401's annual workload is their work-up and participation in the semiannual Weapons and Tactics Instructor (WTI) course conducted by Marine Aviation Weapons and Tactics Squadron One (MAWTS-1) at MCAS Yuma, Arizona. They provide adversary work in Offensive Anti-Air Warfare and Anti Air Warfare exercises during this training evolution.  They also help train new Marine F/A-18 Hornet pilots that are assigned to VMFAT-101 at Marine Corps Air Station Miramar.

History
Marine Fighter Training Squadron 401 (VMFT-401) was activated on March 18, 1986 at Marine Corps Air Station Yuma, Arizona.  In June 1987 the squadron received a number of Israeli F-21A Kfirs and during that year logged more than 4,000 hours of flight time during 16 major exercises.  In 1989, they transitioned to the F-5E Tiger II which they still use.

Following the inactivation of Marine Aircraft Group 46 in June 2009, VMFT-401 transitioned under Marine Aircraft Group 41.

The squadron was recognized by the Commandant of the Marine Corps for flying more than 50,000 mishap-free flight hours.  They broke the 50,000 hour mark in early July 2010 having not had a mishap since October 1995.  At an average of 45 minutes per flight, 50,000 hours equates to nearly 70,000 mishap free sorties.

See also
 List of active United States Marine Corps aircraft squadrons
 United States Marine Corps Aviation

References

Web

 
 
 

Military units and formations in Arizona
Fighter squadrons of the United States Marine Corps
4th Marine Aircraft Wing
Training squadrons of the United States Marine Corps